The canton of Le Malesherbois (before 2021: Malesherbes) is an administrative division of the Loiret department, central France. Its borders were modified at the French canton reorganisation which came into effect in March 2015. Its seat is in Le Malesherbois.

It consists of the following communes:
 
Ascoux
Augerville-la-Rivière
Aulnay-la-Rivière
Auxy
Barville-en-Gâtinais
Batilly-en-Gâtinais
Beaune-la-Rolande
Boësses
Boiscommun
Bondaroy
Bordeaux-en-Gâtinais
Bouilly-en-Gâtinais
Bouzonville-aux-Bois
Boynes
Briarres-sur-Essonne
Bromeilles
Chambon-la-Forêt
Chilleurs-aux-Bois
Courcelles-le-Roi
Courcy-aux-Loges
Desmonts
Dimancheville
Échilleuses
Égry
Escrennes
Estouy
Gaubertin
Givraines
Grangermont
Juranville
Laas
Lorcy
Le Malesherbois
Mareau-aux-Bois
Marsainvilliers
Montbarrois
Montliard
Nancray-sur-Rimarde
La Neuville-sur-Essonne
Nibelle
Ondreville-sur-Essonne
Orville
Puiseaux
Ramoulu
Saint-Loup-des-Vignes
Saint-Michel
Santeau
Vrigny
Yèvre-la-Ville

References

Cantons of Loiret